Brian Banks is a 2018 American biographical drama film directed by Tom Shadyac, written by Doug Atchison, and starring Aldis Hodge as Brian Banks, a high school football linebacker who was falsely accused of rape, convicted, sent to prison and upon his release,  attempted to fulfill his dream of making the National Football League. The film premiered at the LA Film Festival in September 2018, and was theatrically released in the United States on August 9, 2019.

Plot
Brian Banks (Aldis Hodge) is a 27-year-old former high school football star living with his mother (Sherri Shepherd) in Long Beach, California. He is currently on parole and registered as a sex offender due to an incident 11 years prior where he and a classmate, Kennisha (Xosha Roquemore), sneaked off to kiss. When he overheard teachers approaching, he fled to avoid getting caught, leading the scorned Kennisha to falsely accuse him of raping her.

On the advice of his attorney, Banks pled no contest to rape and was sentenced to six years of prison. His childhood dreams of becoming an NFL player are further damaged when new laws require him to wear an ankle monitor at all times and stay 2,000 feet away from schools and public gathering spots, preventing him from playing football, and he has trouble finding legitimate employment due to his criminal record.

Banks approaches the California Innocence Project hoping to clear his name, and they advise him to write a plea of habeas corpus to the California legal system to get them to retry him. When this fails, Innocence Project founder Justin Brooks (Greg Kinnear) explains that the justice system requires new evidence that incontrovertibly points to his innocence before they will hear his pleas; this excludes DNA evidence, which was taken during the original trial but never used in his defense.

Innocence Project lawyers interview several of Banks' former classmates, but their word is not strong enough to cast doubt on Banks' conviction. Banks unexpectedly receives a Facebook friend request from Kennisha, leading him to devise a scheme with several of his friends to trick her into confessing on tape that the rape allegation was fraudulent.

This seemingly succeeds, and Banks takes the tape to the Innocence Project. However, since Kennisha did not know she was being recorded, the evidence is inadmissible in court. Brooks sends the tape to the media, causing public outcry at the injustice of Banks' situation. Banks' parole officer calls him and warns him that his contact with Kennisha is a parole violation, but gives him until his parole expires before reporting the violation and placing Banks back in prison.

Brooks approaches District Attorney Mateo (Jose Miguel Vasquez) and convinces him that Banks needs a new trial. Banks goes to court, but Kennisha refuses to testify and claims that Banks offered her $20,000 to say he didn't rape her on tape. Mateo and Brooks confront her and eventually get her to say on the record that her claim that Banks bribed her was a lie; this casts enough doubt on Banks' guilt to convince the judge to finally overturn Banks' conviction.

Banks cuts off the ankle bracelet and heads to a local park, where he enjoys a game of football with some local children. The final narration reveals that Pete Carroll, a former University of Southern California coach who offered him a scholarship to USC during his high school days, invited him to try out for the Seattle Seahawks; failing to make the team due to his skills atrophying as a result of his extended time in prison, Banks trained hard over the next year and eventually was signed by the Atlanta Falcons.

Cast
Aldis Hodge as Brian Banks
Greg Kinnear as Justin Brooks
Melanie Liburd as Karina Cooper
Xosha Roquemore as Kennisha Rice
Tiffany Dupont as Alissa Bjerkhoel
Sherri Shepherd as Leomia
Jose Miguel Vasquez as District Attorney Mateo
Morgan Freeman as Jerome Johnson (uncredited)
Dorian Missick as Officer Mick Randolph

Release
The film was theatrically released in the United States on August 9, 2019, to low box office results.

Box office 
In the United States and Canada, Brian Banks was released alongside The Kitchen, Dora and the Lost City of Gold, Scary Stories to Tell in the Dark and The Art of Racing in the Rain, and was projected to gross around $2.5 million from 1,327 theaters in its opening weekend. It ended up debuting to $2.1 million. At the end of the film's theatrical release the film grossed $4.3 million.

Critical response
The site's critical consensus reads: "While it remains a reasonably inspiring drama, Brian Banks might have presented a more complex or fully realized version of the real-life story it dramatizes." Metacritic gave the film a weighted average score of 58 out of 100, based on 17 critics, indicating "mixed or average reviews". Audiences polled by PostTrak gave the film an average 4.5 out of 5 stars, while 72% said they would definitely recommend it to a friend.
Reviewing the film in The New York Times, Jeannette Catsoulis praised Hodge's performance, and the movie as a whole: it "isn't a great movie, but it is a worthwhile one". However, she criticised the minor characters as being "underwritten" and the screenplay as being "formulaic" and "heavyhanded", and the film overall as being "sometimes disappointingly bland". Alan Zilberman gave the film 3 stars out of 5 in his review for The Washington Post, praising Hodge's performance and Shadyac's directing.

Accolades 
Brian Banks won the Audience Award for Fiction Feature Film at the 2018 Los Angeles Film Festival.

References

External links
 
 

2018 films
2018 biographical drama films
American biographical drama films
Films about miscarriage of justice
Films scored by John Debney
Films directed by Tom Shadyac
Films set in 2002
Films set in 2010
Films set in 2011
Films set in 2012
Films set in 2013
Films set in Long Beach, California
Films set in Los Angeles
American independent films
2018 independent films
2010s English-language films
2010s American films